Daniel Muñoz Mejia (born 24 May 1996) is a Colombian professional footballer who plays as a right-back for Belgian Pro League club Genk and the Colombia national team. From 2017 until 2019 Munoz played for Águilas Doradas.

Club career 
In May 2020, Muñoz completed a transfer from Atlético Nacional to Genk, for a fee of €4.5 million.

International career
Munoz was called up to the Colombia national team in September 2019, but had to withdraw with a hamstring injury. In March 2020, he was again called up by Carlos Queiroz to the national team.

He made his debut on 3 June 2021 in a World Cup qualifier against Peru. He substituted Stefan Medina in the 56th minute. In less than a minute he committed a foul which was upgraded to a red card after a VAR review.

Honours
Genk
Belgian Cup: 2020–21

References

1996 births
Living people
Sportspeople from Antioquia Department
Colombian footballers
Association football fullbacks
Colombia international footballers
2021 Copa América players
Categoría Primera A players
Belgian Pro League players
Atlético Nacional footballers
K.R.C. Genk players
Colombian expatriate footballers
Colombian expatriate sportspeople in Belgium
Expatriate footballers in Belgium